Adina Pintilie (born January 12, 1980, with the birth name Adina-Elena Pintilie) is a Romanian film director and screenwriter. Her feature length debut film Touch Me Not was awarded the Golden Bear at the 68th Berlin International Film Festival as well as the GFWW Award for Best First Feature at the Berlinale 2018 and nominated at the European Film Award the same year. She also co-founded MANEKINO FILM, an independent production company based in Bucharest.

Also credited for being the co-producer, editor and actress in her film Touch Me Not, Adina Pintilie is also known for her shorter works: “Don’t Get me Wrong” and her short film Oxygen.

She has studied at the Ion Luca Caragiale National University of Theatre and Film.

Filmography

Director

Actress

Writer

Producer

References 

1980 births
Living people
Romanian film directors
Directors of Golden Bear winners
Caragiale National University of Theatre and Film alumni